General elections were held in Malta on 5 September 1998. The result was a victory for the Nationalist Party, which won 35 of the 65 seats.

Results

References

General elections in Malta
Malta
General
Malta